The 1969 Iowa Hawkeyes football team represented the University of Iowa in the 1969 Big Ten Conference football season. Led by fourth-year head coach Ray Nagel, the Hawkeyes compiled an overall record of 5–5 with a mark of 3–4 in conference play, placing in a four-way tie for fifth in the Big Ten. The team played home games at Iowa Stadium in Iowa City, Iowa.

Schedule

Roster

References

Iowa
Iowa Hawkeyes football seasons
Iowa Hawkeyes football